Anna Beninati (born December 24, 1992) is an American Paralympic alpine skier . She won a bronze medal at the 2016 World Cup.

Career 
She studied at Colorado State University.

She first tried a sit-ski (a seated ski device with two skis underneath) in 2011, just two months after the accident.  After lessons with Dave Schoeneck and Peter Mandler, Beninati switched to monoskiing, becoming increasingly independent. In preparation for the Paralympics, she moved to Park City, joining a Paralympic alpine skiing team. In 2015 she won her first national title and a year later she won a medal at the World Cup. 

At the 2016 World Cup, Beninati finished third in the seated slalom race, with a time of 1:54.05,  behind Anna-Lena Forster , with gold in 1:27.98 and Laurie Stephens, with silver in 1:34.83.

The following season, she was named to the United States Paralympic National Ski Team for the 2018 Winter Paralympic Games in Pyeong Chang, South Korea, only to be dropped one month into the Games.

At the 2019 World Para Alpine Skiing Championships, in Kranjska Gora/Sella Nevea in Slovenia, she finished fifth in the seated slalom race, in the super combined and in the seated super-G.

At Paralympic alpine skiing competitions in the United States and Canada she reached the podium 10 times. She is a ski instructor at Snowbird.

References 

1992 births
Paralympic alpine skiers of the United States
Place of birth missing (living people)
Living people
American female alpine skiers
Colorado State University alumni